Safari Guiné Bissau Airlines was an airline in Guinea-Bissau. It was founded in 2010 .

Code data
Safari Airlines operated under:
IATA Code: G6
ICAO Code: BSR
Callsign: BISSAU AIRLINES

Defunct airlines of Guinea-Bissau
Airlines established in 2010
Government-owned airlines
2010 establishments in Guinea-Bissau